A dashboard is a vehicle control panel.

Dashboard may also refer to:

Computing and technology
 Dashboard (business), a collection of information about a business process displayed in a graphical user interface
 Dashboard (macOS), an Apple graphical component for hosting widgets (mini-applications)
 Dashboard of Sustainability, a software package designed to help developing countries achieve the Millennium Development Goals and work towards sustainable development
 Google Dashboard, an online management tool for registered users of Google applications 
 Xbox Dashboard, a game console system menu

Other uses
 "Dashboard" (song), a single by Modest Mouse
 Harry Dashboard, pseudonym of the Irish-Australian poet James Riley (1795-ca.1860)